The Florida Mouse (Podomys floridanus) is a species of rodent in the Cricetidae family. It is the only species in the genus Podomys.  It is found only in the United States.

Its natural habitat is temperate grassland. It is threatened by habitat loss.

References
Footnotes

Literature cited

 
 
 
 
 
 
 

Mammals described in 1889
Mouse
Mammals of the United States
Neotominae
Taxonomy articles created by Polbot
Taxa named by Frank Chapman (ornithologist)